Queena Marian Tillotson (August 21, 1896 – May 28, 1951), known professionally as Queena Mario, was  an American soprano opera singer, newspaper columnist, voice teacher, and fiction writer.

Early life
Queena Marian Tillotson was born in Akron, Ohio, the daughter of James Knox Tillotson and Rose Tillotson. Queena was raised in Plainfield, New Jersey, where she graduated from Plainfield High School. She studied voice with Marcella Sembrich, who advised her name change. She paid for voice lessons by writing newspaper advice columns under the name Florence Bryant, including childrearing advice; "You know a lot when you're 16, you have a lot of theories," she explained of her qualifications.

Career
Mario made her stage debut with the San Carlo Opera Company in 1918. She also toured with the Antonio Scotti Opera Company. She sang at the Metropolitan Opera over 300 times, beginning in 1922 and with a last performance in 1938. She also gave concerts. In 1925 Richard Aldrich of The New York Times described Mario's voice: "The voice is light, it has the grace and flexibility of a light voice, together with agreeable quality and much finished skill in vocalism."

Mario taught voice at the Juilliard School in New York and the Curtis Institute of Music in Philadelphia. Among her students were Jeanne Madden, Helen Jepson and Rose Bampton. She can be heard on at least six recordings from 1924 and 1933, made for the Victor Talking Machine Company.

As a writer, Mario published three opera-themed murder mysteries: Murder in the Opera House (E.P. Dutton, 1934), Murder Meets Mephisto (1942), and Death Drops Delilah (1944).

Personal life
Mario married Metropolitan Opera conductor Wilfred Pelletier on November 23, 1925; they divorced on August 12, 1936. She died in New York in 1951, aged 54 years.

References

External links

 Queena Mario's listing in the San Francisco Opera Performance Archive.

1896 births
1951 deaths
American women novelists
20th-century American novelists
American operatic sopranos
20th-century American women opera singers
20th-century American women writers
American mystery novelists
Women mystery writers
Writers from Akron, Ohio
Novelists from Ohio
Musicians from Akron, Ohio
Singers from Ohio
Writers from Plainfield, New Jersey
Musicians from Plainfield, New Jersey
Plainfield High School (New Jersey) alumni
Novelists from New Jersey
Singers from New Jersey
Juilliard School faculty
Curtis Institute of Music faculty
Novelists from Pennsylvania
Classical musicians from Ohio
Classical musicians from New Jersey
Women music educators
American women academics